Parrish Creek is a stream in Davis County, Utah, United States.

It flows southwest to a point in the foothills northeast of the eastern end of Parrish Lane (400 North) in Centerville.

Parrish Creek was named after Samuel Parrish, a pioneer settler in the area. The creek and the community had originally been named Duel, after a pair brothers that were settlers in the area. (However, the name of the community was later changed to Cherry Creek, and then Centerville, while the name of the creek was changed to Parrish.) After settling along the steam. Mr. Parrish built one of the first (albeit crude) mills in Davis County.

A short way up a trail that roughly follows the stream bed there are some Native American pictographs. There is another trail that runs south of the creek (along the ridge which separates Parrish Canyon from Centerville Canyon) that is one of the recommended hiking routes to Bountiful Peak. The west end of that trail begins along the Bonneville Shoreline Trail, and the east end connects with Skyline Drive.

See also

 List of rivers of Utah
 Wasatch Front

References

External links
 Parrish Creek Pictographs - Centerville, Utah
 

Rivers of Davis County, Utah
Rivers of Utah